The Tetrasporales are a formerly recognized order of green algae, specifically the Chlorophyceae, now included in Chlamydomonadales. AlgaeBase places Tetraspora and Tetrasporaceae in Chlamydomonadales.

References

External links

Scientific references

Scientific databases

 
Chlorophyta orders